The Supreme Court of Bolivia (Corte Suprema de Justicia de Bolivia) was the Bolivia's highest court from 1825 to 2012. It was located in Sucre, 410 kilometres to the south-east of La Paz, Bolivia's capital. The Court was created by the Supreme Decree (Decreto Supremo) of April 27, 1825, which transformed the Royal Audience of Charcas (Audiencia y Cancillería Real de La Plata de los Charcas) of imperial Spain into the Supreme Court of the newly independent country. The Supreme Court of Bolivia was officially inaugurated on July 16, 1827.

Composition 
The Supreme Court of Bolivia was composed of 12 ministers (judges) who served 10-year terms after election by the National Congress.

In 1827, Manuel María Urcullo became the first President of the Supreme Court of Bolivia. He was joined by Ministers (Judges) Mariano Guzmán, Juan de la Cruz Monje y Ortega, and Casimiro Olañeta. The following individuals were among the 56 ministers that served as the court's president:

 José María Serrano
 Casimiro Olañeta
 José María Dalence
 Manuel Sánchez de Velasco
 Pantaleón Dalence
 Belisario Boeto
 Luis Paz
 Ángel Sandóval
 Mario C. Araoz
 José Torrico Sierra
 Manuel Durán Padilla
 Raúl Romero Linares
 Remberto Prado Montaño
 Édgar Oblitas Fernández
 Óscar Hassenteufel Salazar
 Eduardo Rodríguez Veltzé
 Héctor Sandóval Parada

Abolition 
The court was superseded in January 2012 by the Supreme Court of Justice under the 2009 constitution.

See also 

 Supreme Court of Justice (Bolivia)

References 

Bolivia
Government of Bolivia
1825 establishments in Bolivia
2012 disestablishments in Bolivia
Courts and tribunals established in 1825
Courts and tribunals disestablished in 2012